The 1921 Oklahoma A&M Aggies football team represented Oklahoma A&M College in the 1921 college football season. This was the 20th year of football at A&M and the first under John Maulbetsch. The Aggies played their home games at Lewis Field in Stillwater, Oklahoma. They finished the season 5–4–1, 1–1 in the Southwest Conference.

Schedule

References

Oklahoma AandM
Oklahoma State Cowboys football seasons
Oklahoma AandM